Nikolina Tankousheva (born ) is a former Bulgarian artistic gymnast.  

She competed at the 2008 Summer Olympics in Beijing, China, and at the 2007 World Artistic Gymnastics Championships.

References

External links
http://slam.canoe.com/Slam/Olympics/2008Beijing/Disciplines/ga/results/com/ga_00001_TPPRE_w_en.html
https://www.espn.com/oly/summer08/results?eventId=150

1986 births
Living people
Bulgarian female artistic gymnasts
Place of birth missing (living people)
Olympic gymnasts of Bulgaria
Gymnasts at the 2008 Summer Olympics